Lobocheilos bo is a species of cyprinid in the genus Lobocheilos.

References

Cyprinidae
Cyprinid fish of Asia
Taxa named by Canna Maria Louise Popta